Continental Motors Company was an American manufacturer of internal combustion engines. The company produced engines as a supplier to many independent manufacturers of automobiles, tractors, trucks, and stationary equipment (such as pumps, generators, and industrial machinery drives) from the 1900s through the 1960s. Continental Motors also produced automobiles in 1932–1933 under the name Continental Automobile Company. The Continental Aircraft Engine Company was formed in 1929 to develop and produce its aircraft engines, and would become the core business of Continental Motors, Inc.

History
In 1905, Continental Motors was born with the introduction of a four-cylinder, four stroke cycle L-head engine operated by a single camshaft.

In August 1929, the Continental Motors Company formed the Continental Aircraft Engine Company as a subsidiary to develop and produce its aircraft engines.

Continental Motors entered into the production of automobiles rather indirectly. Continental was the producer of automobile engines for numerous independent automobile companies in the 1910s, 1920s, and 1930s, including Durant Motors Corporation which used the engines in its Star, Durant, Flint and Rugby model lines. Following the 1931 collapse of Durant, a group having interest in Durant Motors began assembling their own cars, the De Vaux-Hall Motors Company, using the Durant body dies, in Grand Rapids, Michigan, and Oakland, California, and under the De Vaux brand name.  When De Vaux-Hall collapsed in 1932, unable to pay creditors, Continental Motors assumed automobile assembly and marketed the vehicles under the Continental-De Vaux brand name for the balance of the 1932 model year.

Continental Motors introduced a completely new line of Continental-branded automobiles for 1933. These cars were not based upon the 1931 De Vaux, a product of the De Vaux-Hall, which had been using body dies left over from the former Durant produced by Durant Motors until 1930.

The 1933 Continentals were marketed in three model ranges: the largest and most expensive was the six-cylinder Ace, next was a smaller six called the Flyer and also the low-priced four-cylinder Beacon. The 1933 Beacon roadster was the lowest price full-size car offered for sale in the United States in the 1930s, costing only $US335. None of these met with success in the depression era economy. At this same time, Dominion Motors Ltd. of Canada was building the same Flyer and Beacon cars under arrangement with Continental for sale in the Canadian market, and importing the larger Ace models. Dominion then converted to building Reo brand trucks. The Ace and Flyer models were discontinued at the close of the 1933 model year. Finding that its cars were unprofitable, Continental stopped assembling even Beacon automobiles in 1934.

Continental was a major manufacturer of horizontally opposed 'flat four' airplane engines and supplied a similar engine for Sherman tanks during World War II. Apparently the US government contracts continued during the Korean War. As the jet engine  began to replace piston engine powered airplanes, Continental began losing their military contracts. The jet engine technology thus creating an understandable end to Continental's military prosperity. When Korean War ended, Kaiser Corporation, who used Continental engines in all their vehicles, was able to gain ownership of a Continental engine making factory.* It was during that time of downsizing Continental's operations that many Continental employees dispersed to find jobs elsewhere in the industry -those engineers finding new jobs at other companies like the newly formed American Motors, even Chevrolet.

See http://www.detroiturbex.com/content/industry/conalum/index.html

Kaiser, working with a Continental-designed engine, introduced the USA's first mass-produced OHC inline six-cylinder engine. It debuted in Kaiser-owned Jeep Corporation vehicles in the mid-1960s. However, Stutz built both single and dual overhead cam inline six-cylinder engines in, respectively, the late 1920s and early 1930s (sohc) and the early 1930s (dohc). Moreover, these were fitted in Stutz production cars (though their numbers were comparatively small).

Particular models of John Deere tractors are currently being supplied by Continental since the ownership transfer to Korea, as stated on the tractor's engine identification plate.

Engines

Types
Continental built many engines for the US military, some by license, and many of unusual type.

Inline: several conventional gasoline I6s were built for trucks, the COA331 (licensed from REO), 6602, 22R, and AO895 (also used in some armored vehicles). Later the M-A-N licensed multifuel LDS427, LD465 and turbocharged LDT465 were developed, also for use in trucks.

Radial: in the late 1930s 7 and 9 cylinder air cooled radial aircraft engines were adapted for use in armored vehicles. The W670 and R975 were considered very reliable by the British in North Africa, but were not developed further.

Opposed: just after WWII an air cooled O6 was developed for armored vehicles. All were supercharged, AOS895-3 models had carburetors, -5 models had fuel injection with no increase in power, but greater fuel mileage.

V type: in the early 1950s an air cooled V12 engine was introduced for armored vehicles. Later the AVSI-1790 was developed into the AVDS-1790 diesel version, which was often retro-fitted to earlier vehicles.

Use

Automobiles
The following automobile companies used Continental engines:

 Abbott-Detroit
 Ace
 Anderson
 Apperson
 Auburn
 Bantam Reconnaissance Car(Y112 4 cyl. first Jeep during World War II)
 Barley
 Bay State
 Beggs
 Benham
 Bendix
 Birmingham
 Blackhawk
 Bour-Davis
 Bush
 Cardway
 Case
 Checker (pre-1965)
 Colby
 Columbia
 Comet
 Continental (see above)
 Corbitt
 Crawford
 Dagmar
 Darling
 Davis
 Detroiter
 De Vaux
 Diana
 Dodge
 DuPont
 Durant Motors, including:
 Durant 
 Eagle
 Flint
 Star
 Economy
 Elcar
 Empire
 Enger
 Erskine
 Ferris
 Ghent
 Graham-Paige
 Graham
 Hanson
 Hansa
 Hertz
 Hollier
 Howard
 Howmet TX (turbine race car)
 Huffman
 Imperial
 Jewett
 Jones
 Jordan
 Kaiser-Frazer, including 
 Allstate
 Frazer
 Henry J
 Kaiser 
 Willys (after 1953)
 Keller
 Kent
 Kenworthy
 Kleiber
 Kline Kar
 Lambert
 Leach
 Lexington
 Howard
 Liberty
 Littlemac
 Locomobile
 Luverne
 Marendaz
 Marion-Handley
 Merit
 Meteor
 Monitor
 Moon
 Morris Cowley
 Morris (manf'd under licence)
 National
 Noma
 Norwalk
 O'Connor
 Ogren
 Overland
 Owen Magnetic
 Paige
 Pan-American
 Paterson
 Pathfinder
 Peerless
 Piedmont
 Playboy
 Ralf-Stetysz
 Reiland Bree
 Reo
 Wolverine
 ReVere
 Roamer
 Rock Falls
 Romer
 Ruxton
 Saxon
 Sayers
 Scripps-Booth
 Severin
 S&M
 Stanwood
 Stephens
 Thorne
 Velie
 Vogue
 Walker
 Washington
 Wasp
 Westcott
 Windsor
 Woods
 Yellow

Motorcycles
 Indian (pre 1953 models)

Trucks and buses

 AM General (medium and heavy trucks for military use)
 Bessemer 
 Biederman
 Brockway
 Commerce
 Corbitt
 Denby 
 Divco
 Federal
 GMC
 Indiana
 McKeen bus for Minneapolis (only 2)
 Menominee
 Minerva
 Moreland
 NETCO
 Reo
 Sterling
 Wachusett

Tractors
Some models used Continental engines for only part of their production lifespan; others used them exclusively.

 Allis-Chalmers Model G
 Allis-Chalmers Model U
 ATC TerraTrac
 Case Model VC
 Ferguson  TE-20
 Ferguson TO-20
 Ferguson TO-30
 Ferguson TO-35
 International 350 and Farmall 350 diesels
 Massey-Harris 44-6 and 101Sr
 Massey-Harris Pony
 Massey-Harris 33 and 333 diesels
 Massey-Harris 50 / Ferguson F-40
 Massey-Harris 81
 Oliver Super 44
 Some Silver King tractors
Massey Ferguson 135

Other Vehicles
(Vehicles often change engines during production and/or service life)

 Trucks
 BRC ½ ton (227 kg) 4x4
 M35 series 2 ½ ton (2268 kg) 6x6 
 M54 series  5 ton (4536 kg) 6x6 
 G116 10 ton (9272 kg) 6x6
  M249 and 250 tractors 4x4(for “Atomic Cannon”)
  Gun motor carriages and tractors
 M5 13 ton (11793 kg) tractor
 M7 105mm howitzer
 M8 16 ton (14515 kg) tractor
 M12 155mm gun
 M18 76mm AT gun
 M40 155mm gun
 M42 40mm (x2) AA gun
 M43  howitzer
 M44 155mm howitzer
 M52 105mm howitzer
 M53 155mm gun
 M55  howitzer
  Landing vehicles and carriers
 LVT(A)(1), (2), and (A)(2)
 LVT (4), (A)(4), and (A)(5)
 LVPT 5
 M75 Armored personnel carrier
 M76 1 ½ ton (1361 kg) carrier
 Tanks
 M3 light (37mm gun)
 M3 medium (75mm gun)
 M4 medium (75mm/76mm gun)
 M41 light (76mm gun)
 M47 medium (90mm gun)
 M48 medium (90mm/105mm gun)
 M60 medium (105mm gun)
 M103 heavy (120mm gun)
 Armored recovery vehicles (tank chassis / winch capacity)
 M31(M3 / )
 M32 (M4 / )
 M51 (M103 / )
 M88 (M48 / )

References

Engines

Citations

Sources

External links
 "Flying With Forty Horses" by Chet Peek - Book covering the story of the Continental A-40, the engine which revived the struggling aviation industry during the Great Depression
Hemmings Classic Car "Powerful as the Nation"

Motor vehicle engine manufacturers
Defunct motor vehicle manufacturers of the United States
Engine manufacturers of the United States
Manufacturing companies established in 1905
American companies established in 1905